Zoveydi, sometimes rendered as Zobeydi or Zobidi, may refer to:
 Zobeydi, Shadegan
 Zoveydi-ye Maghamez
 Zoveydi-ye Musa
 Zoveydi-ye Ramezan